The Palathulli (Malayalam:പലതുള്ളി) program is a water conservation campaign run by the Malayala Manorama newspaper in Kerala, India, for raising awareness on the importance of water conservation and rainwater harvesting.

The campaign included exhibitions and video shows which were organized throughout the region.

The newspaper was awarded the 2005 IPDC-UNESCO Prize for Rural Communication.

See also
IPDC
UNESCO

External links
Indian Newspaper Malayala Manorama wins IPDC-UNESCO Prize for Rural Communication
Source Weekly, No. 7-8, 16 March 2006 (email newsletter )
Malayala Manorama Online, English edition; (Malayalam language edition)
International Programme for the Development of Communication (IPDC) - current and previous prize-winners.

Water conservation in India
Environment of Kerala